The 1964 Lamar Tech Cardinals football season represented Lamar State College of Technology—now known as Lamar University—as a member of the Southland Conference during the 1964 NCAA College Division football season. Led by second-year head coach Vernon Glass, the Cardinals compiled an overall record of 6–3–1 with a mark of 3–0–1 in conference play, winning the Southland  title. Lamar Tech was invited to the inaugural Pecan Bowl, losing to the State College of Iowa by the score of 19–17. The team played home game at the newly-opened Cardinal Stadium, located on Lamar Tech's campus in Beaumont, Texas.

Glass was named NCAA College Division Coach of the Year for the season.

Schedule

References

Lamar
Lamar Cardinals football seasons
Southland Conference football champion seasons
Lamar Tech Cardinals football